Leyla Soleymani is a scientist and Canada Research Chair at McMaster University's faculty of engineering. Her research includes the development of advanced materials for biosensing and repellent surfaces.

Biography 
Soleymani received her Ph.D. in Electrical and Computer Engineering from the University of Toronto in 2010 under the mentorship of  Ted Sargent. Her dissertation was entitled "Ultrasensitive Detection of Nucleic Acids using an Electronic Chip".

In 2019, Soleymani developed a plastic wrap that repels pathogens such as the superbug methicilin-resistant Staphyloccocus aureus from surfaces. In 2020, this wrap is being adapted for halting the spread of COVID-19.

References 

Canadian women engineers
Academic staff of McMaster University
University of Toronto alumni
Year of birth missing (living people)
Living people